is a Japanese manga series written and illustrated by Satsuki Yoshino. It started serialization in Square Enix's Gangan Online February 2009 issue. The story follows Seishu Handa, a calligrapher who moves to the remote Goto Islands off the western coast of Kyushu, and his various interactions with the people of the island. An anime adaptation by Kinema Citrus aired in Japan between July and September 2014. Funimation has licensed the series for streaming and home video release. In February 2014, Yen Press announced they have licensed Barakamon for English release in North America.
 
A spin-off manga series  started serialization in the November 2013 issue of Square Enix's Monthly Shonen Gangan magazine. An anime television adaptation by Diomedéa aired in Japan between July and September 2016.

Plot
Seishu Handa is a professional calligrapher, despite his young age. When the elderly curator of an exhibition criticizes his calligraphy for being too unoriginal ("like a textbook"), Seishu gets angry and punches him. Because of this, his father sends him off for a retreat on Goto Island, near Kyushu. There, he meets the colorful villagers, interacts with them, and begins to find his own style.

The title of the series means "energetic/cheerful one" in the local provincial Goto Islands' dialect. The first episode is also called "Barakakodon/ばらかこどん" which means "energetic/cheerful kid", which refers to Naru Kotoishi, a very hyperactive kid that comes into Handa's life.

The story of prequel spin-off Handa-kun is about the hilarious high school days of the calligraphy genius, Seishu Handa, who was also protagonist of Barakamon.

Characters

Barakamon

Main characters

Handa is a 23-year-old master calligrapher who dedicates his life to the art. After punching a gallery curator for calling his calligraphy "boring," "rigid," "academic," and "bland." , he is sent by his father to a small town in the Goto Islands to focus on his calligraphy as he waits out his "banishment". He is typically childish and a short-tempered adult. He's also easy to scare. He's affectionately called  by the people of the village area of town. As a teenager, he was equally popular among the boys and girls from his school but was under the impression that most of the school hated him when in fact, he was worshipped by others who misunderstood his methods from interactions with him. He eventually discovers the truth of his reputation and was dismayed to hear his best friend was teasing him the whole time. While Handa came to understand that, he was overwhelmed by the popularity.

Naru is a 7-year-old (6-year-old in the beginning) girl in her first year at a local elementary; she lives on the Goto Islands alone with her grandfather. Her personality is very energetic, curious, and childish. She visits Handa's house every day to play. She is typically reckless, thinking after she acts; this is shown by all the time she disobeys Handa.

Supporting characters

A 14-year-old middle school student with a bit of a boyish personality who is friends with Tamako and Naru. Naru learned many weird things from emulating her (mainly things she shouldn't know), for which Seishu scolded her. She created five copies of the key to Seishu's house back when it was the kids' base, one of which she lost in the hills behind his house.

A 14-year-old middle school student. She has been a lover of manga since childhood and recently began aiming to be a manga artist. She has been struggling with her repressed yaoi interests ever since Handa moved in. She also owns one of the keys to Seishu's house.

Son of the village chief. He is a high school student who hates how he is average in everything, such as looks, grades, sports, and activities. He delivers meals to Handa's home and sometimes cooks for him. He likes to fish, and aims for the hisanio, or the striped beakfish, when fishing with others. He also owns one of the keys to Seishu's house.

She is a child from the island, and Naru's best friend. She is very shy and quick to cry, especially when dealing with strangers or whenever she's really happy. When she first met Handa, she quickly started crying.

A boy with a buzzcut and friend of Naru. He is just like Naru: a really energetic kid. He loves to hunt for beetles and other insects. The first time he meets Seishu, he gives him a butt jab.

Tamako's responsible younger brother. He loves gaming, and frequently watches his grandmother's store for her.

The village chief and Hiroshi's father. He is laid back and brings Seishu medicine and food.

The vice-principal of Naru's school, who Seishu says doesn't look like a teacher. He has a habit of smoking and enjoys fishing in the village's pond.

Seishu's art dealer, and friend since middle school. He arranges Handa's calligraphy work and other needs. He says that he prioritizes Handa for his skills as a money maker, but actually cares deeply for him. He is responsible for Handa's extreme anxiety as a high schooler when he jokingly told him their senior hated him.

A high school calligrapher. He idolizes Seishu and started calligraphy professionally after seeing an exhibition of his. He got the first prize in a calligraphy competition in which Handa entered. He is generally polite, if a bit effete, and hates bugs.

Naru's grandfather. He gives Seishu a ride on his tractor both times Seishu came to the island. He is kind to Seishu but frequently asks favors of him.

Miwa's father. He is an eccentric and intimidating man, who Seishu thinks resembles a Yakuza.

Seishu's father. He is a man of few words and a little awkward. He was the one to send Seishu to the island, and also lived there when he was around his son's age.

Seishu's mother. She was against him going to the island, and tries to convince him not to go back, believing his time on the island turned him into a strange person. Despite her appearances, she is actually rather outspoken and short-tempered.

Handa-kun

Leader of the Handa Club, he initially hated Handa when he thought Handa was trying to take the job of class rep away from him. When Handa turns the job down, Aizawa claims that Handa did so because he cares deeply for the feelings of others. Aizawa then relinquishes the job of class rep to Handa, while taking the vice class rep position himself resolving to do Handa's job anyway.

An attractive and popular student who was jealous of Handa for stealing his fans and popularity. When Handa shows him kindness (while mistaking him for a homeless person), he gave up his modeling job to be closer to Handa and joins the Handa Club.

A large rather thuggish brute who was formerly an androgynous boy that was often picked on before he became a truant, to get stronger and succeeded. He stayed at home until he was visited by Handa and the latter unintentionally saved him from a group of thugs. Grateful, Tsutsui decided to go back to school and dedicate himself to being Handa's bodyguard and get him to notice him. He becomes a member of the Handa Club and of the four members, he is the one who believes Handa is a strong guy.

A second year student, he is an average young man. He is a member of the Handa Club and of the four members, he is the only normal member as he is more rational minded than the others. Because of this, Kondo is the only one who can properly understand Handa's thoughts while the others often pick on him. Due to his personality, he is the only one that Handa is comfortable with though believes him to be harassing him.

Hanada is a young man that is physically identical to Handa in almost every way aside from his overbite which he keeps hidden under mask. He pretends to be Handa often.

She is a classmate of Handa. Initially, a normal quiet girl who had feelings for Handa. These feelings turn into an obsession after he shows her kindness and she becomes a stalker of his. She is nicknamed the "Eraser" both for how her peers disappear and how Handa returned her eraser. 

Maiko is a girl with pink hair in twin-tails. She has a crush on Handa and gives him a love letter, though he takes it as a letter of challenge. She has a way of giving back-handed comments about her best friend, Juri.

Juri is a girl with an oversized head. She seems to have a crush on Handa though she denies it. Maiko is her best friend, though Juri questions why she is friends with her as Maiko often makes insulting comments about her.

Media

Manga

Barakamon began serialization in Square Enix's Gangan Online February 2009 issue. The first tankōbon volume was released on July 22, 2009; twelve volumes have been released as of September 22, 2014. It was announced in the seventeenth volume that the manga would be ending with the release of the eighteenth volume in December 2018. The series was licensed by Yen Press in February 2014, who released the first volume on October 28, 2014.

A spin-off/prequel manga, titled Handa-Kun, written and illustrated also by Satsuki Yoshino, started serialization in Square Enix's Monthly Shonen Gangan in the November 2013 issue. It focuses on Seishu's life as a high school student, six years prior to Barakamon. The first tankōbon volume was released June 21, 2014; seven volumes have been released as of September 12, 2016. The spin-off ended in the Monthly Shōnen Gangan magazine's July 2016 issue, which was scheduled for release on June 11, 2016. Elex Media Komputindo later licensed the manga in 2017. The series was published in english by Yen Press.

Anime
An anime adaptation by the studio, Kinema Citrus, began airing on July 5, 2014. Funimation has licensed the series for streaming and home video release. The opening theme song is  performed by Super Beaver, and the ending theme is "Innocence" by NoisyCell.

An anime television adaptation of the Handa-kun spin-off manga was announced on Square Enix's Gangan Online website on February 1, 2016. It began airing on July 7, 2016 on TBS and CBC, and later began airing on MBS, BS-TBS, and TBS Channel 1. The 12-episode series was directed by Yoshitaka Koyama and produced by Diomedéa. Michiko Yokote, Mariko Kunisawa, and Miharu Hirami wrote the series' scripts, while Mayuko Matsumoto designed the characters and Kenji Kawai composed the music. The opening theme song, titled "The LiBERTY", was performed by Fo'xTails, and the ending theme song, titled "HIDE-AND-SEEK", was performed by Kenichi Suzumura. Funimation has also licensed the series for streaming and home video release and plans a broadcast dub for the series.

Barakamon episode list

Handa-kun episode list

Notes

References

External links
  
  
 Handa-kun (anime) at TBS 
 

2000s webcomics
2010s webcomics
Anime series based on manga
Comedy anime and manga
Funimation
Gangan Online manga
Japanese webcomics
Kinema Citrus
Manga adapted into television series
Nippon TV original programming
Shōnen manga
Slice of life anime and manga
Square Enix franchises
Television shows based on Japanese webcomics
Webcomics in print
Yen Press titles